Andrew Levitas (born September 4, 1977) is an American painter, sculptor, filmmaker, writer, producer, photographer, restaurateur, and actor.

Early life 
Levitas was born in New York City. He attended Horace Mann School and then Dalton School in Manhattan. After graduating from the Dalton School, he attended New York University. He graduated in 2000 with a degree from the Gallatin School of NYU.  He is Jewish.

Art career
In addition to a growing list of American and international gallery exhibitions, Levitas’ work has garnered attention through top auction houses, museums, and art fairs. 2012 highlights include a solo exhibition Metalwork Photograph: Sculptures at Phillips de Pury in Manhattan, as well as a ten-year retrospective Andrew Levitas: A Brief Survey 2002–2012 at New York University. 2014 highlights include the first solo exhibition ever presented at the highly anticipated Phillips, Berkeley square which included examples of  Levitas's earlier two-dimensional artwork in which he successfully fused metalwork and photography, as well as examples of the artist's more recent works depicting crumpled sheets and three-dimensional freestanding installations, all made in his distinctive and innovative style.

Photographic sculpture 
In 2004 Levitas produced his "Metalwork Experiment." Developed by the artist, Metalwork Photography photographic sculptures are formed by a process involving the transfer of photographs onto custom transparencies that are in turn melted onto hand detailed sheets.

Levitas’ installations are each composed of multi-paneled interlocking metal sheets whose collective impact transcends their individual materiality. Other works included in the exhibition are crumpled sheets of metal that resonate with John Chamberlain's mangled installations, inspired by the action Abstract Expressionist paintings that typified the Post-War New York School. However, as opposed to Chamberlain's incorporation of readymades, Levitas's creation and subsequent disfiguration of his own artwork adds a performative twist to his artwork that situates it at the vanguard of contemporary art.
 The result is a work that combines the imagery of a photograph with the presence of a sculpture. While these works are printed as editions, they function as unique objects since each print differs, depending on the level of hand tooling.

Paintings 
Levitas’ "organic abstractions" (paintings built from home made pigments, canvas, and organic materials – in some cases entire trees) have also received critical acclaim. The work, often reflective of Los Angeles life, is in part a commentary on emotion and the way we choose to express ourselves, as well as the ways in which we insulate ourselves from essential truth. The work also stresses a larger discourse on nature, the organic and its place in the contemporary world.

Artists collaborations
In 2015, Levitas created the CUBA X LEVITAS as part of an artist collaboration with the skate brand Supra.

Film career
Levitas is the founder of Metalwork Pictures a media production company which develops and produces original content. Titles include Minamata (Johnny Depp, Bill Nighy, Hiroyuki Sanada), My Zoe (Julie Delpy, Daniel Brühl, Gemma Arterton, Richard Armitage), Georgetown (Christoph Waltz, Vanessa Redgrave, Annette Bening), The White Crow (Ralph Fiennes), Farming (Kate Beckinsale, Gugu Mbatha-Raw), The Gateway (Bruce Dern, Olivia Munn, Frank Grillo), Last Moment of Clarity (Samara Weaving, Udo Kier, Brian Cox), The Quarry (Michael Shannon, Shea Whigham), Flower (Zoey Deutch), At Any Price (Dennis Quaid, Zac Efron), Affluenza (Nicola Peltz), and The Art of Getting By (Emma Roberts, Freddie Highmore).

Currently, Levitas is in post-production on his latest directing project Minamata starring Academy Award nominee Johnny Depp, BAFTA and Golden Globe winner Bill Nighy and Hiroyuki Sanada as Mitsuo Yamazaki, The film follows William Eugene Smith's 1971 journey to the Japanese fishing village of Minamata to bear witness to the devastation of its townspeople by mercury poisoning caused by the Chisso corporation.

Prior to Minamata, Levitas wrote and directed Lullaby which stars Amy Adams, Richard Jenkins, Terrence Howard, Jennifer Hudson, and Garrett Hedlund. The film, an exploration of patients’ rights, was described by Pete Hammond (Deadline) as a “strong human drama” with “Jenkins a true actor’s actor, delivering a very Oscar-worthy supporting turn.”

In 2017 he produced British film The White Crow written by David Hare and directed by Ralph Fiennes. It stars Oleg Ivenko as the ballet dancer Rudolf Nureyev, chronicling his life and dance career. It is inspired by the book Rudolf Nureyev: The Life by Julie Kavanagh. It premiered at the 2018 Telluride Film Festival and the 2018 BFI London Film Festival. The film also screened at the Tokyo International Film Festival, Cinemania (Bulgaria) and Febiofest (Czech Republic). Ralph Fiennes received the Special Achievement Award for Outstanding Artistic Contribution at the Tokyo International Film Festival, with the film receiving a Tokyo Grand Prix nomination. The film was released on March 22, 2019 in the UK (StudioCanal) and on April 26, 2019 in the US (Sony Pictures Classics). The New York Times wrote “The White Crow is a portrait of the artist as a young man, an attempt to show the complex array of factors — biographical, psychological, social, political — that led to the moment when the 23-year-old dancer made a decision that would change the history of ballet: Nureyev became Nureyev by defecting from Russia to the West at Le Bourget airport in France in June 1961… Throughout [the film], Fiennes and Hare suggest the extraordinary will and curiosity that drove Nureyev to dance, and to seek out art and culture wherever he could.”

Levitas brought to life director Adewale Akinnuoye-Agbaje’s own story in Farming . Screen Daily wrote of the film, “Actor turned director Adewale Akinnuoye-Agbaje makes an arresting feature debut with Farming. Told with raw emotion and lurid violence, it transforms elements of his life story into a disturbing, eye-opening coming of age drama.” Farming premiered at the 2018 Toronto International Film Festival on 8 September in the Discovery Section. The film won the Michael Powell Award at the 2019 Edinburgh Film Festival. Lionsgate UK released the film in the United Kingdom on 11 October 2019, followed by a United States release on 25 October.

In 2018, Levitas produced My Zoe from writer and director Julie Delpy. My Zoe premiered at the 2019 Toronto International Film Festival as part of the Platform Prize program. IndieWire raved that “Delpy’s ability to believe in both her audience and her wild story remains compelling throughout the film... Delpy earns every minute of the story, one that shows off her ability (and desire) mix things up with a fresh eye.”

Levitas produced 2019 film Georgetown from Christoph Waltz in his feature directorial debut. Georgetown had its world premiere at the Tribeca Film Festival on April 27, 2019. The Hollywood Reporter praised the film, noting that "it's the kind of serious but broadly appealing, modestly scaled picture that people love to say doesn't exist any more."

Academic career
Levitas is also a part-time faculty member at New York University, teaching a course on "The Artist's Mind."

Personal life
Since October 2013, Levitas has been in a relationship with Welsh classical-crossover singer Katherine Jenkins. The pair were engaged in April 2014, and married at Hampton Court Palace on September 27, 2014. Jenkins gave birth to the couple's first child, a daughter named Aaliyah Reign Levitas, on September 30, 2015.  With his wife, Levitas wrote the song "8 Nights of Joy," which was recorded at Abbey Road Studios and was on her album "Home Sweet Home." Their son, Xander Robert Selwyn, was born in April 2018.  Levitas was previously co-owner of West Village hotspot Play and is current part-owner of Soho restaurants Little Prince and Lola Taverna.

Philanthropy
Levitas is a global patron for the Wilderness Foundation and an Ambassador of Tusk Trust.

Filmography

Producer 
Untitled Ramin Bahrani Project (2011)  (co-producer)
Great Neck (2013) (producer)
Regular Boy (2014) (producer)
Below the Surface (2011) (producer)
The Art of Getting By (2011) (executive producer)
Bad Actress (2011) (co-executive producer)
Searching for Glitter (2009) (completed) (associate producer)
Innocence (2014) (producer)
Affluenza (2014) (Executive Producer)
Against All Enemies (TBA) (producer)
Flower (2017) (executive producer)
The White Crow (2018) (producer)
Farming (2018) (producer)
My Zoe (2019) (producer)
Last Moment of Clarity (2019) (producer)
Georgetown (2019) (producer)
The Quarry (2019) (executive producer)
Last Moment of Clarity (2020) (producer)
The Gateway (2021) (producer, writer)

Actor 
The Art of Getting By .... (2011)
Holy Rollers (2010) .... David
The Box (2009/I) .... Black Op
Entourage .... Gregg (1 episode, 2009)
Friendly Fire (2006) (V)
Beauty Shop (2005) .... Stacy
Hellbent (2004) .... Chaz
North Shore .... Reese (1 episode, 2004)
It's All Relative .... Eddie Donovan (1 episode, 2003)
Psycho Beach Party (2000) .... Provoloney
Boy Meets World .... Luther (1 episode, 1999)
Party of Five .... Cameron Welcott (6 episodes, 1999)
The Nanny .... Michael (4 episodes, 1998–1999)
Nick Freno: Licensed Teacher .... Marco Romero (21 episodes, 1997–1998)
In & Out (1997) .... Locker Room Guy

Director 
Lullaby (2013) (director & writer)
Minamata (2020) (director & writer)

References

1977 births
Living people
American male film actors
Jewish American male actors
Dalton School alumni
Horace Mann School alumni
New York University alumni
New York University faculty
Artists from New York City
Place of birth missing (living people)
21st-century American Jews